Adolfo Belmonte (born 10 January 1945) was a Mexican cyclist. He competed at the 1964 Summer Olympics and the 1968 Summer Olympics.

References

External links
 

1945 births
Living people
Mexican male cyclists
Sportspeople from Baja California
People from Ensenada, Baja California
Olympic cyclists of Mexico
Cyclists at the 1964 Summer Olympics
Cyclists at the 1968 Summer Olympics
Pan American Games medalists in cycling
Pan American Games silver medalists for Mexico
Cyclists at the 1967 Pan American Games